Mao Wenlong (10 February 1576 – 24 July 1629), courtesy name Zhennan, was a Chinese military general of the Ming dynasty. He is best known for commanding Ming forces in the naval battles against forces of the Manchu-led Qing dynasty in the Yellow Sea during the Qing conquest of the Ming. He was also known for excelling in artillery warfare and for successfully incorporating Western-style tactics into the Chinese military.

Early life
Mao was born in Hangzhou and worked as a fortuneteller in his youth. He joined the Ming military in northern Shanhaiguan around 1600.

Career
Mao is sometimes blamed for the Later Jin invasion of Joseon. He was known for operating against the Later Jin dynasty from bases within the Joseon dynasty, a Ming ally at that time. When the Later Jin forces mounted a punitive expedition into Joseon, Mao ordered a general retreat of all Ming forces. This angered many Beijing merchants who had previously traded with the Korean peninsula.

Mao never dared to drag major Later Jin cities into war even when there was a strategic advantage in doing so. In this way Mao was able to bring to bear the influence of many powerful Ming officials against Yuan Chonghuan (1584–1630), a fellow Ming military commander.

Mao engaged in widespread smuggling using the Ming marine corps, contributing heavily to the booming economy of northern China. He was eventually caught for smuggling and executed by Yuan Chonghuan, a fellow military commander who had been conferred the imperial sword of absolute authority by the last Ming emperor. It is believed that Mao's death led in part to an economic downturn in the Ming dynasty.

See also 
 Wuqiao mutiny
 Kong Youde
 Geng Zhongming
 Shang Kexi

Further reading
 
 Martino Martini, De Bello Tartarico Historia (Antwerp, 1654) or Regni Sinensis a Tartaris evastati depopulatique enarratio (1661).  Mao Wenlong's name is rendered by Martini into Latin as  "Maovenlungus".
 Johan Nieuhof, ''An embassy from the East-India Company of the United Provinces, to the Grand Tartar Cham, emperor of China : delivered by their excellencies Peter de Goyer and Jacob de Keyzer, at his imperial city of Peking wherein the cities, towns, villages, ports, rivers, &c. in their passages from Canton to Peking are ingeniously described by John Nieuhoff ; also an epistle of Father John Adams, their antagonist, concerning the whole negotiation ; with an appendix of several remarks taken out of Father Athanasius Kircher ; Englished and set forth with their several sculptures by John Ogilby (1673), p. 266 sq.

References

1576 births
1629 deaths
Ming dynasty generals
People from Hangzhou
Generals from Zhejiang
Executed people from Zhejiang
Executed Ming dynasty people
People executed by the Ming dynasty by decapitation